Twenty-two teams participated in the 1997 ICC Trophy, the sixth edition of the tournament. Two teams, Italy and Scotland, were making their debuts.

Argentina
Only players who appeared in at least one match at the tournament are listed. The leading run-scorer is marked with a dagger (†) and the leading wicket-taker with a double dagger (‡).

Coach:  J. G. Ferguson

 Gastón Arizaga
 Sergio Ciaburri
 Donald Forrester
 Bernardo Irigoyen ‡
 Martin Juarez
 Guillermo Kirschbaum
 Diego Lord
 Miguel Morris

 Matias Paterlini †
 Hernan Pereyra
 Andres Perez Rivero
 Maximiliano Riveros
 Brian Roberts
 Miguel Rowe
 Christian Tuñon
 Malcolm van Steeden

Source: ESPNcricinfo

Bangladesh
Only players who appeared in at least one match at the tournament are listed. The leading run-scorer is marked with a dagger (†) and the leading wicket-taker with a double dagger (‡).

Coach:  Gordon Greenidge

 Akram Khan
 Aminul Islam †
 Athar Ali Khan
 Enamul Haque
 Hasibul Hossain
 Jahangir Alam
 Khaled Mahmud
 Habibul Bashar

 Khaled Mashud
 Minhajul Abedin
 Mohammad Rafique ‡
 Naimur Rahman
 Saiful Islam
 Sanwar Hossain

Source: ESPNcricinfo

Bermuda
Only players who appeared in at least one match at the tournament are listed. The leading run-scorer is marked with a dagger (†) and the leading wicket-taker with a double dagger (‡).

Coaches:  Allan Douglas and  Bob Simpson

 Roger Blades
 Kameron Fox
 Corey Hill
 Delano Hollis
 Kevin Hurdle
 Arnold Manders
 Charlie Marshall
 Dean Minors

 Bruce Perinchief
 Clay Smith
 Dexter Smith
 Glen Smith
 Albert Steede
 Roger Trott
 Janeiro Tucker †‡

Source: ESPNcricinfo

Canada
Only players who appeared in at least one match at the tournament are listed. The leading run-scorer is marked with a dagger (†) and the leading wicket-taker with a double dagger (‡).

Coach:  Larry Gomes

 Latchman Bhansingh
 Desmond Chumney
 Muneeb Diwan
 Derick Etwaroo
 Alex Glegg
 Nigel Isaacs
 Martin Johnson
 Davis Joseph

 Ingleton Liburd †
 Don Maxwell
 Derek Perera
 Brian Rajadurai
 Danny Ramnarais
 Sukhjinder Rana
 Barry Seebaran ‡
 Shiv Seeram

Source: ESPNcricinfo

Denmark
Only players who appeared in at least one match at the tournament are listed. The leading run-scorer is marked with a dagger (†) and the leading wicket-taker with a double dagger (‡).

Coach:  Ole Mortensen

 Thomas Hansen
 Lars Hedegaard
 Morten Hedegaard
 Søren Henriksen
 Johnny Jensen †
 Peer Jensen
 Søren Kristensen

 Mickey Lund
 Steen Nielsen
 Carsten Pedersen
 Anders Rasmussen
 Baljit Singh
 Søren Sørensen ‡
 Søren Vestergaard

Source: ESPNcricinfo

East and Central Africa
Only players who appeared in at least one match at the tournament are listed. The leading run-scorer is marked with a dagger (†) and the leading wicket-taker with a double dagger (‡).

Coach:  Ismail Hassan

 Haroon Bags
 Imran Brohi
 Arshad Dudhia
 Arif Ebrahim
 Chad Gomm ‡
 Murtaza Jivraj
 James Komakech
 John Lubia

 Tendo Mbazzi
 Imran Mohamed
 Benjamin Musoke
 Frank Nsubuga
 Arif Pali
 Yekesh Patel †
 Faizel Sarigat

Source: ESPNcricinfo

Fiji
Only players who appeared in at least one match at the tournament are listed. The leading run-scorer is marked with a dagger (†) and the leading wicket-taker with a double dagger (‡).

 Taione Batina
 Joji Bulabalavu
 Iniasi Cakacaka
 Taione Cakacaka
 Joeli Mateyawa
 Neil Maxwell †‡
 Jason Rouse

 Jone Seuvou
 Asaeli Sorovakatini
 Jone Sorovakatini
 Lesi Sorovakatini
 Eroni Tadu
 Atunaisi Tawatatau
 Waisake Tukana

Source: ESPNcricinfo

Gibraltar
Only players who appeared in at least one match at the tournament are listed. The leading run-scorer is marked with a dagger (†) and the leading wicket-taker with a double dagger (‡).

Coach:  Richard Cox

 Richard Buzaglo
 Tim Buzaglo
 Steve Cary
 Nigel Churaman ‡
 Clive Clinton
 Gary De'Ath
 Terence Garcia

 Adrian Hewitt
 Daniel Johnson
 Geoff Mills
 Rudolph Phillips
 Dave Robeson
 Christian Rocca †
 Stephen Shephard

Source: ESPNcricinfo

Hong Kong
Only players who appeared in at least one match at the tournament are listed. The leading run-scorer is marked with a dagger (†) and the leading wicket-taker with a double dagger (‡).

Coach:  David Trist

 Stewart Brew
 Ray Brewster
 Mark Eames
 Riaz Farcy †
 Pat Fordham
 Steven Foster
 Alexander French
 Munir Hussain

 David Jones
 Roy Lamsam
 Martin Lever
 Kamran Raza
 Rahul Sharma
 Ravi Sujanani
 Michael Swift
 Mohammad Zubair ‡

Source: ESPNcricinfo

Ireland
Only players who appeared in at least one match at the tournament are listed. The leading run-scorer is marked with a dagger (†) and the leading wicket-taker with a double dagger (‡).

Coach:  M. V. Narasimha Rao

 Justin Benson
 Dekker Curry †
 Neil Doak ‡
 Angus Dunlop
 Ryan Eagleson
 Peter Gillespie
 Uel Graham
 Garfield Harrison

 Derek Heasley
 Alan Lewis
 Paul McCrum
 Greg Molins
 Andrew Patterson
 Mark Patterson
 Alan Rutherford

Source: ESPNcricinfo

Israel
Only players who appeared in at least one match at the tournament are listed. The leading run-scorer is marked with a dagger (†) and the leading wicket-taker with a double dagger (‡).

Coach:  Steven Herzberg

 Raymond Aston ‡
 Hillel Awasker
 Louis Hall
 Moses Jawalekar
 Benzie Kehimkar
 Alan Moss
 Yefeth Nagavkar
 Stanley Perlman

 David Silver †
 Paul Smith
 Avi Talkar
 Moses Talker
 Adrian Vard
 Menashe Wadavkar
 Valice Worrell

Source: ESPNcricinfo

Italy
Only players who appeared in at least one match at the tournament are listed. The leading run-scorer is marked with a dagger (†) and the leading wicket-taker with a double dagger (‡).

Coach:  Doug Ferguson

 Sajjad Ahmed
 Andrea Amati
 Massimo da Costa
 Samantha de Mel
 Benito Giordano †
 Kamal Kariyawasam
 Ricardo Maggio
 Razzaq Mohammad

 Thomas Parisi
 Andrea Pezzi
 Alessandro Pieri
 Akhlaq Qureshi ‡
 Gamini Rajapakse
 Valerio Zuppiroli
 Filippo Zito

Source: ESPNcricinfo

Kenya
Only players who appeared in at least one match at the tournament are listed. The leading run-scorer is marked with a dagger (†) and the leading wicket-taker with a double dagger (‡).

Coach:  Sandeep Patil

 Sandeep Gupta
 Aasif Karim ‡
 Hitesh Modi
 Thomas Odoyo
 Maurice Odumbe †
 Tito Odumbe
 Lameck Onyango

 Kennedy Otieno
 Brijal Patel
 Martin Suji
 Tony Suji
 David Tikolo
 Steve Tikolo

Source: ESPNcricinfo

Malaysia
Only players who appeared in at least one match at the tournament are listed. The leading run-scorer is marked with a dagger (†) and the leading wicket-taker with a double dagger (‡).

Coach:  Mumtaz Yusuf

 Saat Jalil
 Ramesh Menon
 Marimuthu Muniandy
 Jeevandran Nair
 Suresh Navaratnam ‡
 Vivek Rajah
 Dinesh Ramadas

 Kunjiraman Ramadas
 Venu Ramadass
 Rohan Selvaratnam
 Suresh Singh
 Tan Kim Hing
 Santhara Vello
 Matthew William †

Source: ESPNcricinfo

Namibia
Only players who appeared in at least one match at the tournament are listed. The leading run-scorer is marked with a dagger (†) and the leading wicket-taker with a double dagger (‡).

Coach:  Neil Lenham

 Wayne Ackerman
 Mark Barnard
 David Coetzee
 Morne Karg
 Danie Keulder †
 Bjorn Kotze
 Deon Kotze

 Gavin Murgatroyd
 Darren Seager
 Ian Stevenson
 Jackie Thirion
 Ian van Schoor
 Melt van Schoor
 Rudi van Vuuren ‡

Source: ESPNcricinfo

Netherlands
Only players who appeared in at least one match at the tournament are listed. The leading run-scorer is marked with a dagger (†) and the leading wicket-taker with a double dagger (‡).

Coach:  John Bell

 Zulfiqar Ahmed
 Peter Cantrell
 Tim de Leede †
 Godfrey Edwards
 Tjade Groot
 Asim Khan ‡
 Roland Lefebvre
 Marc Nota

 Reinout Scholte
 Ravi Singh
 Jeroen Smits
 Steven van Dijk
 Klaas-Jan van Noortwijk
 Robert van Oosterom
 Andre van Troost
 Bas Zuiderent

Source: ESPNcricinfo

Papua New Guinea
Only players who appeared in at least one match at the tournament are listed. The leading run-scorer is marked with a dagger (†) and the leading wicket-taker with a double dagger (‡).

Coach:  Errol Harris

 Charles Amini
 Fred Arua
 Toka Gaudi
 Kosta Ilaraki
 Rarua Ipi
 Vai Kevau
 Wari Kila
 Leka Leka

 James Maha
 Navu Maha
 Ipi Morea
 John Ovia †
 Vavine Pala ‡
 Tuku Raka
 Keimelo Vuivagi

Source: ESPNcricinfo

Scotland
Only players who appeared in at least one match at the tournament are listed. The leading run-scorer is marked with a dagger (†) and the leading wicket-taker with a double dagger (‡).

Coach:  Jim Love

 Mike Allingham
 Ian Beven ‡
 John Blain
 David Cowan
 Alec Davies
 Scott Gourlay
 Stuart Kennedy
 Dougie Lockhart

 Bryn Lockie
 Ian Philip
 George Salmond †
 Keith Sheridan
 Mike Smith
 Andy Tennant
 Kevin Thomson
 Greig Williamson

Source: ESPNcricinfo

Singapore
Only players who appeared in at least one match at the tournament are listed. The leading run-scorer is marked with a dagger (†) and the leading wicket-taker with a double dagger (‡).

Coach:  Grant Stanley

 Dinesh Chelvathurai
 Abhijit Dass
 Rod David
 Kiran Deshpande
 Goh Swee Heng
 Charlie Gunningham
 Rex Martens
 Thaiyar Mohamed †

 Stacey Muruthi
 Manoj Patil
 Remesh Ramadas
 Anthon Ranggi
 Moiz Sithawalla
 Jeremy Stone
 Ravi Thambinayagam
 Graham Wilson ‡

Source: ESPNcricinfo

United Arab Emirates
Only players who appeared in at least one match at the tournament are listed. The leading run-scorer is marked with a dagger (†) and the leading wicket-taker with a double dagger (‡).

Coach:  Champaka Ramanayake

 Adnan Mushtaq
 Ahmed Nadeem
 Ali Akbar
 Arif Yousuf
 Arshad Laeeq ‡
 Asim Saeed
 Azhar Saeed †
 Basil Jayawardene

 Mahmood Pir Baksh
 Mohammad Atif
 Mohammad Hyder
 Mohammad Tauqir
 Saeed-al-Saffar
 Saleem Raza
 Shehzad Altaf
 Vijay Perera

Source: ESPNcricinfo

United States
Only players who appeared in at least one match at the tournament are listed. The leading run-scorer is marked with a dagger (†) and the leading wicket-taker with a double dagger (‡).

Coach:  Roger Harper

 Compton Adams
 Aijaz Ali
 Sohail Alvi
 Zamin Amin
 Faoud Bacchus †
 Reginald Benjamin
 Kenrick Dennis
 Raymond Denny

 Eon Grant
 Abdul Islam
 Naseer Islam
 Derek Kallicharran ‡
 Rudy Lachman
 Edward Lewis
 Paul Singh
 Albert Texeira

Source: ESPNcricinfo

West Africa
Only players who appeared in at least one match at the tournament are listed. The leading run-scorer is marked with a dagger (†) and the leading wicket-taker with a double dagger (‡).

 Kome Agodo
 Chuka Ahuchogu
 Kwasi Asiedu
 Alfred Crooks
 Seye Fadahunsi ‡
 Dipo Idowu
 Albert Kpundeh
 Sahr Kpundeh

 Uche Ntinu
 Edinam Nutsugah
 Obo Omoigui
 Kofi Sagoe
 Serry Turay
 Okon Ukpong †
 Daniel Vanderpuje-Orgle
 George Wiltshire

Source: ESPNcricinfo

Sources
 CricketArchive: Averages by teams, Carlsberg ICC Trophy 1996/97
 ESPNcricinfo: Carlsberg ICC Trophy, 1996/97 / Statistics

Cricket squads
ICC World Cup Qualifier